Oel Dhakwa is a town and a nagar panchayat in Lakhimpur Kheri district in the Indian state of Uttar Pradesh.

Demographics
 India census, Oel Dhakwa had a population of 12,958. Males constitute 53% of the population and females 47%. Oel Dhakwa has an average literacy rate of 51%, lower than the national average of 59.5%: male literacy is 59%, and female literacy is 42%. In Oel Dhakwa, 17% of the population is under 6 years of age.

References

Cities and towns in Lakhimpur Kheri district